William Anderson (23 December 1853 – 3 May 1898), was a politician in colonial Victoria (Australia), member of the Victorian Legislative Assembly for Creswick, and later Windermere.  He was also the fourth  Chief President of the  Australian Natives' Association.

Early Years 
William Anderson was born in Dean near Creswick in 1853. His father, James Anderson, James Anderson, was born in Cumnock, Scotland. James Anderson was partner in the family business of Anderson Brothers, with saw-milling, landed and mining interests, and William Anderson inherited these interests. He was educated to secondary level at Ballarat College.

His partner was Miss Naples, they had 8 children.

Community  
By the 1880s he was taking a prominent role in community organisations in the Creswick and Ballarat area, serving as vice-president of the Ballarat Agricultural and Pastoral Society and later as the Western District representative on the Board of Public Health. Anderson was president of the Bungaree Shire Council in 1883-1886 and again in 1896–1897.

In 1886 he was elected as Member of the Legislative Assembly (MLA) for the electorate of Creswick, losing this seat in 1889. In 1894 he became MLA for Windermere, and held that seat until his untimely death in 1898. He was remembered as one of the most popular members of the House, who was ‘always listened to with attention ... when he rose to speak on matters pertaining to farming and mining’.

Australian Natives' Association 
William Anderson was a founding member of the Creswick No 11 branch of the Australian Natives' Association (ANA) in 1880, and was elected its first president. In 1882 he served as Chief President of the association. The branch was very active and hosted the 1884 Annual Conference. He was active in promoting new branches, achieving 5 new branches in 1882, but perhaps his most valuable contribution to the ANA was to persuade Alex Peacock to join the Creswick branch.

Later Years 
Anderson died on 3 May 1898 after a short illness: erysipelas of the head. He left a widow and 8 children, the eldest being only ten year old.

References

1853 births
1898 deaths
Members of the Victorian Legislative Assembly
19th-century Australian politicians
People from Creswick, Victoria
Australian people of Scottish descent
19th-century Australian businesspeople